House of Debt: How They (and You) caused the Great Recession, and How We Can Prevent It from Happening Again is a 2014 book by economists Atif Mian and Amir Sufi on the linkages between household debt in the United States and the 2008 financial crisis.

References 

2014 non-fiction books
Books about economic history
University of Chicago Press books